Pesikta (Hebrew: פסיקתא) refers to a number of collections of rabbinic literature:

 Pesikta de-Rav Kahana, published in 1868 and 1962
 Pesikta Rabbati, composed around 845 CE
 The Pesikta Zutarta, also called Midrash Lekah Tov, by Tobiah ben Eliezer